Anthony Michael Percival Smith (called Michael; 5 September 192427 September 2013) was Archdeacon of Maidstone from 1979 until 30 September 1989.

Percival Smith was educated at Shrewsbury and then served in the Rifle Brigade from 1942 to 1946. When peace returned he continued his education at Gonville and Caius College, Cambridge and Westcott House, Cambridge. He was ordained deacon in 1950, and priest in 1951. After a curacy at Holy Trinity, Leamington he was Domestic Chaplain to the Archbishop of Canterbury from 1953 to 1957. He held incumbencies at Upper Norwood (1957–1966), Yeovil (1966–1972) and Addiscombe (1972–1979).

References

1924 births
Archdeacons of Maidstone
2013 deaths
Rifle Brigade officers
Alumni of Gonville and Caius College, Cambridge
Alumni of Westcott House, Cambridge
People educated at Shrewsbury School